Calvin L. Giles (born July 10, 1962) is an Illinois state politician. He was a Democratic member of the  Illinois House of Representatives representing the 8th district from 1993 until 2007. Calvin replaced Robert LeFlore who died in 1993.

Early life
Giles earned his bachelor's degree in management from Northeastern Illinois University. He is also a landscape designer.

State Representative
As a member of the Illinois House of Representatives, Giles was on five committees: Elementary and Secondary Education (Chairperson), Financial Institutions, Telecommunications, Tourism and Conventions, and Committee of the Whole. He was defeated for re-election in the Democratic primary on March 21, 2006, by LaShawn Ford.

Personal life
Giles and his wife, Tracey, have one child.

References

External links
Illinois General Assembly – Representative Calvin L. Giles (D), 8th District
Illinois House Resolution  HR1585 – Honors Illinois State Representative Calvin Giles on his hard work and dedication to the people of the State of Illinois – January 9, 2007
Chicago Tribune, October 13, 2004. Choices for the legislature. Newspaper endorses Green Party candidate Julie Samuels in Samuels' district.
Illinois State Board of Elections – Candidate Detail: Calvin L. Giles

1962 births
Living people
Northeastern Illinois University alumni
Democratic Party members of the Illinois House of Representatives